Veliko suđenje is a Croatian film. It was released in 1961.

External links
 

1961 films
Croatian children's films
1960s Croatian-language films
Yugoslav drama films
Croatian drama films